The Bailiwick Repertory Theatre was a theater company in Chicago founded in 1982 that produced eclectic works.  It staged productions at the Bailiwick Arts Center in the city's Lakeview neighborhood from 1995 until 2009. Productions include Biello & Martin's 1999 production of Fairytales/Breathe and the 2007 American premiere of Jerry Springer - The Opera.

Bailiwick Repertory Theater was officially dissolved in the fall of 2009. At that time, many of the company's former artists got together to create a new company in order to continue Bailiwick's legacy of producing daring and risky musicals and plays. This new company is called Bailiwick Chicago, launched on November 8, 2009. Bailiwick Chicago is producing non-equity musicals and plays, with a special emphasis on cultural, social and sexual diversity. There is no brick & mortar location for the company at this time. Productions are mounted at various locations around Chicago.

The former location of the Bailiwick Arts Center at 1229 W. Belmont Ave. is now owned and operated by Theater Wit.

See also
Theatre in Chicago
Bailiwick Chicago

References

External links 
Bailiwick Chicago

Theatre companies in Chicago
Performing groups established in 1982
1982 establishments in Illinois